All the qualified teams, qualify for the 2014 Little League Softball World Series in Portland, Oregon.

United States

Central
The tournament took place in Indianapolis, Indiana from July 19–24.

East
The tournament took place in Bristol, Connecticut from July 18–25.

Southeast
The tournament took place in Warner Robins, Georgia from July 24–29.

Southwest
The tournament took place in Waco, Texas from July 26–30.

West
The tournament took place in San Bernardino from July 19–26.

Oregon District 4
The tournament took place in Portland, Oregon at Alpenrose Dairy from July 15–19.

International

Asia Pacific
The tournament took place in Clark, Philippines from June 29–July 1.

Canada
The tournament took place in Victoria, British Columbia from August 2–4.

Europe and Africa
The tournament took place in Kutno, Poland from July 24–27.

Latin America
The tournament took place in Maunabo, Puerto Rico from July 16–20.

References

2014 in softball
Little League Softball World Series